Scrobipalpa soffneri is a moth in the family Gelechiidae. It was described by Povolný in 1964. It is found in Bulgaria, the southern Ural Mountains and Turkmenistan.

References

Scrobipalpa
Moths described in 1964